Defending champion Shingo Kunieda defeated Alfie Hewett in the final, 6–1, 6–4 to win the men's singles wheelchair tennis title at the 2021 US Open. It was his eighth US Open singles title and 25th major singles title overall.

Seeds

Draw

Finals

References

External links 
 Draw

Wheelchair Men's Singles
U.S. Open, 2021 Men's Singles